The discography of American rap group House of Pain consists of three studio albums, one compilation album, one extended play and eight singles.

Albums

Studio albums

Extended plays

Compilations

Singles

Other appearances

References

External links
 House of Pain at AllMusic
 
 

Hip hop discographies
Discographies of American artists